Kavem Ajoel Rakem Hodge (born 21 February 1993) is a Dominican cricketer who has played for both the Windward Islands and the Combined Campuses and Colleges in West Indian domestic cricket.

Career
Hodge was born in Dominica's capital, Roseau, but was raised in Antrizle, a small village on the island's east coast. After captaining the Windward Islands under-19s at regional tournaments, he played for the West Indies under-19s at the 2012 Under-19 World Cup in Australia. Hodge had made his first-class debut for the Windwards earlier in the year, when he played against the Leeward Islands in the 2011–12 Regional Four Day Competition. For the 2013–14 season, he switched to the Combined Campuses, qualifying by virtue of being a student at the University of the West Indies. He also signed with the St Lucia Zouks for the inaugural Caribbean Premier League (CPL) season, but did not play a game.

In June 2018, he was named in the Cricket West Indies B Team squad for the inaugural edition of the Global T20 Canada tournament. He made his Twenty20 debut for St Lucia Stars in the 2018 Caribbean Premier League on 11 August 2018. He was the leading run-scorer for the Windward Islands in the 2018–19 Regional Super50 tournament, with 179 runs in eight matches.

In October 2019, he was named in the Windward Islands' squad for the 2019–20 Regional Super50 tournament. He was the leading run-scorer for the Windward Islands in the tournament, with 341 runs in seven matches. In July 2020, he was named in the St Lucia Zouks squad for the 2020 Caribbean Premier League.

In December 2020, Hodge was named in the West Indies' Test squad for their series against Bangladesh.

References

External links
Player profile and statistics at CricketArchive
Player profile and statistics at ESPNcricinfo

1993 births
Living people
Combined Campuses and Colleges cricketers
Dominica cricketers
Saint Lucia Kings cricketers
Windward Islands cricketers
People from Roseau